Goweroconcha is a genus of three species of pinwheel snails that are endemic to Australia's Lord Howe Island in the Tasman Sea.

Species
 Goweroconcha waterhousiae  (Hedley, 1897) – cinnamon-zigzag pinwheel snail
 Goweroconcha wenda  Iredale, 1944 – pale-zigzag pinwheel snail
 Goweroconcha wilsoni  Iredale, 1944 – Wilson's pinwheel snail

References

 
 
Taxa named by Tom Iredale
Gastropod genera
Gastropods of Lord Howe Island